Krūmiņa (masculine: Krūmiņš) is a Latvian topographic surname, derived from the Latvian word for "bush" (krūms). Individuals with the surname include:

Elita Krūmiņa (born 1965), auditor general of Latvia
Ivita Krūmiņa (born 1981), Latvian ice hockey player
Marta Krūmiņa-Vitrupe (1908–2010), Latvian poet, writer and chess master
Gerda Krūmiņa (born 1984), Latvian biathlete player
Linda Krūmiņa (born 1984), Latvian chess player

References

Toponymic surnames
Latvian-language feminine surnames